Prosper-Gabriel Audran (1744–1819) was a French etcher. Audran was born in Paris, the grandson of Jean Audran,  and was a pupil of his uncle Benoit II, but having no vocation for art, he abandoned it for the law. He afterwards became teacher of Hebrew in the Collège de France, which office he retained until his death in 1819. He etched some studies of heads.

References
 

1744 births
1819 deaths
18th-century engravers
19th-century engravers
Engravers from Paris
Academic staff of the Collège de France
French Hebraists